Je suis malade is a studio album by French singer  and songwriter Serge Lama, released in 1973 on Philips Records.

Commercial performance 
The album sold 110,000 copies in only 15 days.

US Billboard's 30 June 1973 issue shows the LP in the top 10 in both France and French Belgium.

Track listing

References

External links 
 Serge Lama – Je suis malade at Discogs
 Serge Lama – Je suis malade on Ultratop.be

1973 albums
Serge Lama albums
Philips Records albums